"Six Hands Across a Table" is the twenty-fifth episode of the second series of the 1960s cult British spy-fi television series The Avengers, starring Patrick Macnee and Honor Blackman. It was first broadcast by ABC on 16 March 1963. The episode was directed by Richmond Harding and written by Reed R. de Rouen.

Plot
Cathy becomes romantically involved with shipyard owner Oliver Waldner, blissfully unaware that he is masterminding a dastardly plan to gain control of most of  Britain’s shipbuilding industry. After she nearly dies in an apparent accident, Steed sets out to prove that Waldner has murdered a business rival.

Cast
 Patrick Macnee as John Steed
 Honor Blackman as Cathy Gale
 Guy Doleman as Oliver Waldner
 Campbell Singer as George Stanley
 Philip Madoc as Julian Seabrook
 Edward de Souza as Brian Collier
 John Wentworth as Sir Charles Reniston
 Sylvia Bidmead as Rosalind Waldner
 Frank Sieman as Bert Barnes
 Stephen Hancock as Draughtsman
 Freda Bamford as Lady Reniston
 Gillian Barclay as Miss Francis
 Ilona Rodgers as Receptionist
 Ian Cunningham as Butler, Thomas

References

External links

Episode overview on The Avengers Forever! website

The Avengers (season 2) episodes
1963 British television episodes